Chilton is a census-designated place (CDP) and unincorporated community in Falls County, Texas, United States. It had a population of 776 at the 2020 census.

It is located in western Falls County. U.S. Route 77 forms the western edge of the community, leading north  to Waco and south  to Rosebud. Texas State Highway 7 passes through the center of Chilton, leading east  to Marlin, the county seat, and west  to Bruceville-Eddy.

The Chilton Independent School District offers extra-curricular activities, most notably football, which is played in the stadium at Featherston Field. In 2006, Chilton won its second 1A state football championship.

Demographics 

As of the 2020 United States census, there were 776 people, 247 households, and 190 families residing in the CDP.

External links

References

Unincorporated communities in Texas
Census-designated places in Falls County, Texas
Census-designated places in Texas